The "University of Arkansas Fight Song", commonly abbreviated to "Arkansas Fight", is the primary fight song of the athletics teams of the University of Arkansas. The words and tune to the song were written in 1913 by William Edwin Douglass, a student at the time, and instrumentation and chords were added by Henry D. Tovey, his music professor. The song originated as the "Field Song" and, as can be interpreted from the lyrics, was intended as a football-exclusive song.

Lyrics
The lyrics to "Arkansas Fight" are:

Other Uses
The melody of the fight song, albeit with different words, is used by the athletic teams of Wright State University.

The #NeverYield campaign started in 2013 at Arkansas was derived from a line in the fight song: "Arkansas will never yield".

Notes

References

University of Arkansas
Arkansas Razorbacks
Southeastern Conference fight songs
American college songs
College fight songs in the United States
Songs about Arkansas